{{Infobox country
|native_name            = Reichsstadt Rosheim (de)Ville libre impériale de Rosheim (fr)
|conventional_long_name = Imperial City of Rosheim
|common_name            = Rosheim
|
|image_coat             = Blason Rosheim 67.svg
|
|era                    = Middle Ages
|status                 = City
|empire                 = Holy Roman Empire
|government_type        = Republic
|
|year_start             = 1303
|year_end               = 1679
|
|event_pre              = First mentioned
|date_pre               = 778
|event_start            = Imperial immediacy
|date_start             = 
|event1                 = Foundation ofthe Décapole
|date_event1            = 1354
|event2                 = Awarded to France
|date_event2            = 1648
|event_end              = Abolition of Décapoleand of Rosheimerindependence
|date_end               = 
|
|p1                     = Duchy of Swabia
|image_p1               = 
|s1                     = Early modern France
|flag_s1                = Royal Standard of the King of France.svg
|
|capital                = Rosheim
|
|footnotes              = 
}}

Rosheim is a commune in the Bas-Rhin department in Grand Est in north-eastern France.

It is a winemaking town on the tourist "Road of the Wines of Alsace" and the Route Romane d'Alsace ("Romanesque route of Alsace").

Geography
Distance from Paris 450 km, Strasbourg 25 km, Obernai 7 km, Molsheim 7 km.

History
Rosheim was first mentioned in a document in 778 as Rodasheim. In 1262 it received its town charter, combined with the right to build a town wall.
From the 14th to 17th centuries, Rosheim was an Imperial City of the Holy Roman Empire, and founded the Décapole confederation with nine other Alsatian Imperial Cities in 1354, the goal was to maintain their rights. Like the other Decapolitan cities, it was awarded to France by the Peace of Westphalia and finally lost its independence under the Treaties of Nijmegen and was annexed by France.

Population

Sights
 Church Saint-Pierre-et-Paul (building 12th century, tower 14th century, organ 18th century)
 Church Saint-Etienne (18th century, belltower 12th century)
 Maison païenne (“pagan house”, 12th century)
 City Hall (18th century)
 Old well (Puits aux six seaux'') (17th century)
 Four fortified tower-gates (13th and 14th century)
 Half-timbered houses (16th century)

Notable people
 Heinrich Eggestein (ca. 1415–88), pioneering book printer
 Jean-Marie Lehn (born 1939), Nobel Prize 1987
 Claude Vasconi (born 1940), architect

See also
 Communes of the Bas-Rhin department

References

External links

 Official website
 Official tourist office website 
 Pictures of the Saint Peter and Paul's church

Décapole
Communes of Bas-Rhin
Bas-Rhin communes articles needing translation from French Wikipedia